Saoirse Una Ronan (born 12 April 1994) is an American-born Irish actress. Primarily known for her work in period dramas since adolescence, she has received various accolades, including a Golden Globe Award, in addition to nominations for four Academy Awards and five British Academy Film Awards.

Ronan made her acting debut in 2003 on the Irish medical drama series The Clinic and her film debut in I Could Never Be Your Woman (2007). She had her breakthrough role as a precocious teenager in Joe Wright's Atonement (2007), which earned her a nomination for the Academy Award for Best Supporting Actress. Her career progressed with starring roles as a murdered girl seeking closure in The Lovely Bones (2009) and a teenage assassin in Hanna (2011), and the supporting role of a baker in The Grand Budapest Hotel (2014). Ronan received critical acclaim and nominations for the Academy Award for Best Actress for playing a homesick Irish immigrant in 1950s New York in Brooklyn (2015), the eponymous high school senior in Greta Gerwig's Lady Bird (2017), and Jo March in Gerwig's Little Women (2019). She also won a Golden Globe Award for Lady Bird.

On stage, Ronan portrayed Abigail Williams in the 2016 Broadway revival of The Crucible and Lady Macbeth in the 2021 West End revival of The Tragedy of Macbeth. In 2016, she was featured by Forbes in two of their 30 Under 30 lists, and in 2020, The New York Times ranked her tenth on its list of the greatest actors of the 21st century.

Early life
Saoirse Una Ronan was born on 12 April 1994 in the Bronx, a borough of New York City, to Irish parents Monica (née Brennan) and Paul Ronan, both from Dublin. Her father worked in construction and in bars before training as an actor in New York, and her mother worked as a nanny and had acted as a child. Her parents were initially undocumented immigrants who had left Ireland due to the recession of the 1980s, and struggled economically during their time in New York. The family moved back to Dublin when Ronan was three years old. She was raised in Ardattin, County Carlow, where she attended Ardattin National School. Her parents later had her tutored privately at home. In her early teens, she was living again in Dublin with her parents, who settled in the seaside village of Howth. She was raised Catholic, but says she questioned her faith as a child.

Career

Early work and breakthrough (2003–2009)
Ronan made her screen debut on Irish national broadcaster RTÉ, in the 2003 prime time medical drama The Clinic and appeared in the mini-serial Proof. During the same time, Ronan auditioned for the part of Luna Lovegood in the fantasy film Harry Potter and the Order of the Phoenix (2007), a role she lost out to fellow Irish actress Evanna Lynch. Ronan's first film was Amy Heckerling's romantic comedy I Could Never Be Your Woman, which was filmed in 2005. It was theatrically released in a few international markets in 2007 and given a direct-to-video release in the US in 2008, after it struggled to attract financing and several deals disintegrated during its post-production. In the film, Ronan portrayed the daughter of Michelle Pfeiffer's character and Paul Rudd co-starred as Pfeiffer's love interest. Joe Leydon of Variety labelled the film "desperately unfunny" but considered the interplay between Ronan and Pfeiffer's characters to be among the film's highlights.

At the age of 12, Ronan attended a casting call for Joe Wright's 2007 film adaptation of Ian McEwan's novel Atonement. She auditioned for and won the part of Briony Tallis, a 13-year-old aspiring novelist, who affects several lives by accusing her sister's lover of a crime he did not commit. She acted alongside Keira Knightley and James McAvoy. Budgeted at US$30 million, the film earned over US$129 million worldwide. Ty Burr of The Boston Globe called her "remarkable [and] eccentric", and Christopher Orr of The Atlantic wrote that she is "a marvel, elegantly capturing the narcissism and self-doubt that adhere to precocity". Ronan was nominated for a BAFTA Award, a Golden Globe Award and an Academy Award for Best Supporting Actress, becoming the seventh youngest nominee in that category.

Ronan played the daughter of an impoverished psychic (played by Catherine Zeta-Jones) in the supernatural thriller Death Defying Acts (2007) and starred as Lina Mayfleet, a heroic teenager who must save the inhabitants of an underground city named Ember in the fantasy film City of Ember (2008). Both films received a mixed critical reception and failed at the box office. In a review for the latter, the critic Stephen Holden took note of how Ronan's talents were wasted in it.

In 2009, Ronan starred alongside Rachel Weisz, Mark Wahlberg, Susan Sarandon and Stanley Tucci in Peter Jackson's supernatural drama The Lovely Bones, an adaptation of the book of the same name by Alice Sebold. Ronan played 14-year-old Susie Salmon, who, after being raped and murdered, watches from the after-life as her family struggles to move on with their lives while she comes to terms with her quest for vengeance. Ronan and her family were originally hesitant for Ronan to accept the role due to its subject matter, but agreed after Jackson assured them that the film would not feature gratuitous scenes of rape and murder. Several sequences in the film relied on extensive special effects and much of Ronan's scenes were filmed in front of a blue screen. Reviewers were critical of the film's story and message, but Richard Corliss of Time believed that Ronan had successfully invested the gruesome tale with "immense gravity and grace". He later considered it to be the third best performance of the year. Sukhdev Sandhu of The Daily Telegraph considered Ronan to be the sole positive aspect of the production, writing that she "is simultaneously playful and solemn, youthful yet old beyond her years". The film was a box office disappointment. It earned Ronan a BAFTA Award for Best Actress in a Leading Role nomination.

Rise to prominence (2010–2014)
In Peter Weir's war drama The Way Back (2010), Ronan played the supporting part of Irena, a Polish orphan during World War II, who joins escaped Siberian convicts in a  trek to India. It co-starred Jim Sturgess, Colin Farrell and Ed Harris, and was filmed on location in Bulgaria, India and Morocco. The following year, Ronan reunited with Joe Wright to play the title character in the action film Hanna, about a 15-year-old girl raised in the Arctic wilderness to be an assassin. The film co-starred Eric Bana and Cate Blanchett as Hanna's father and a villainous CIA agent, respectively. Ronan performed her own stunts and in preparation, she spent several months training in martial arts, stick fighting and knife fighting. Ronan's performance and the film's action sequences were praised by critics. In his review for Rolling Stone, Peter Travers termed the film "a surreal fable of blood and regret" and labelled Ronan an "acting sorceress". Hanna was a moderate commercial success. She voiced the lead role in the dubbed English version of Studio Ghibli's anime film Arrietty. At the age of 16, Ronan was invited to join the Academy of Motion Picture Arts and Sciences.

In 2011, Ronan took part in a promotion for the Irish Film Institute's Archive Preservation Fund, in which she was digitally edited into popular Irish films of the past, as well as documentary footage. Ronan and Alexis Bledel played the titular assassins in Geoffrey S. Fletcher's action film Violet & Daisy (2011). Eric Goldman of IGN compared the film unfavourably to the work of Quentin Tarantino and commented that Ronan's abilities had surpassed the material. Peter Jackson approached Ronan to play an elf in The Hobbit film series, but she withdrew from the project due to scheduling conflicts. She was instead drawn to Neil Jordan's horror film Byzantium (2012), as the "dark, gothic and twisted" project provided her an opportunity to play a more complex and mature character. The film starred Gemma Arterton and her as mother-and-daughter vampires. Writing for Radio Times, the critic Alan Jones found the film to be an "evocative fairy tale that uses vampires as a prism to comment on humanity" and considered both Arterton and Ronan to be "radiant" in it.

In a 2013 film adaptation of Stephenie Meyer's novel The Host, Ronan played the dual role of Melanie Stryder, a human rebel, and Wanderer, a parasitic alien. Critics disliked the film; Manohla Dargis termed it "a brazen combination of unoriginal science-fiction themes [and] young-adult pandering", but took note of an "otherworldly aspect to [Ronan's] screen presence, partly due to her stillness and her own translucent eyes, which can suggest grave intensity or utter detachment". In Kevin Macdonald's drama How I Live Now, an adaptation of the novel of the same name by Meg Rosoff, Ronan played an American teenager sent to a remote farm in the United Kingdom during the outbreak of a fictional World War III. Olly Richards of Empire found Ronan to be in "typically watchable form" in it, but the film earned little at the box office. In her final film release of the year, Ronan voiced a barmaid named Talia in the critically panned animated film Justin and the Knights of Valour.

Ronan had two film releases in 2014 with widely diverse critical receptionsthe acclaimed comedy film The Grand Budapest Hotel from the director Wes Anderson and Ryan Gosling's panned directorial debut Lost River. In the former, an ensemble film headed by Ralph Fiennes and Tony Revolori, Ronan played the supporting part of the love interest to Revolori's character. It was the first project that she filmed without her parents accompanying her on set. The film earned over $174 million on a $25 million budget and was ranked by the BBC as one of the greatest films of the century. In the surrealistic fantasy film Lost River, Ronan played a mysterious young girl named Rat who owns a pet rat; Geoffrey Macnab of The Independent termed the film a "wildly self-indulgent affair" but praised Ronan's "tough but vulnerable" portrayal.

Established actress (2015–present)

After starring in Stockholm, Pennsylvania (2015), a psychological thriller about Stockholm syndrome, Ronan played the lead role of Eilis Lacey, a young homesick Irishwoman in 1950s New York City, in the drama Brooklyn. Directed by John Crowley, the film is based on the novel of the same name by Colm Tóibín. Ronan believed that several aspects of her character's development and journey mirrored her own. The film and Ronan's performance were acclaimed; Peter Bradshaw of The Guardian considered it to be a "heartfelt and absorbing film" and wrote that Ronan's "calm poise anchors almost every scene and every shot". Kenneth Turan of Los Angeles Times took note of the "overwhelming empathy she creates with the subtlest means, the remarkable way she's able to create achingly personal, intensely emotional sequences while seeming not to be doing very much at all." Ronan received nominations for the Academy Award for Best Actress and the Golden Globe Award for Best Actress in a Drama.

In 2016, Ronan moved to New York City to begin rehearsals for her debut appearance on Broadway, in a revival of Arthur Miller's play The Crucible. She took the role of Abigail Williams, a manipulative maid responsible for the death of 150 people accused of witchcraft. Based on the Salem witch trials, the play was directed by Ivo van Hove and ran for 125 performances. In preparation, she read Stacy Schiff's book The Witches: Salem, 1692, and collaborated closely with van Hove to empathise with her villainous character. Instead of relying on previous portrayals of Williams, Ronan played her as "more victim than victimizer". Writing for The Hollywood Reporter, David Rooney considered Ronan to be "icy and commanding" and Linda Winer of Newsday commented that she had played the part "with the duplicity of a malevolent surfer-girl".

Ronan next voiced Marguerite Gachet in the biographical animated drama Loving Vincent (2017), and starred alongside Billy Howle as troubled newlyweds on their honeymoon in a film adaptation of Ian McEwan's novel On Chesil Beach. In a mixed review of the latter film, Kate Erbland of IndieWire thought Ronan was underutilised in it and that her performance had been overshadowed by that of Howle. She starred in Greta Gerwig's coming-of-age film Lady Bird, in which she played the titular role of Christine "Lady Bird" McPherson, a high school senior who shares a tumultuous relationship with her mother (played by Laurie Metcalf). It ranks among the best-reviewed films of all time on the review-aggregator site Rotten Tomatoes. Deeming Ronan's performance one of the best of the year, A. O. Scott of The New York Times wrote, "Ronan navigates each swerve in Lady Birds story with an uncanny combination of self-confidence and discovery. She is as spontaneous and unpredictable as an actual 17-year-old ... which suggests an altogether stupefying level of craft." She won the Golden Globe Award for Best Actress in a Comedy or Musical; and received Academy Award, BAFTA and SAG nominations for Best Actress.

In 2017, Ronan hosted an episode of the NBC sketch comedy Saturday Night Live, in which one of her sketches was criticised for its stereotypical portrayal of Irish people, and featured in the music video for Ed Sheeran's song "Galway Girl". The following year, she starred in an adaptation of Anton Chekhov's play The Seagull, in which she played Nina, an aspiring actress. In a mixed review of the film, Michael O'Sullivan of The Washington Post praised Ronan's performance, writing that she "makes for an incandescent Nina, especially in her loopy final-act speech". She starred as Mary Stuart in the period drama Mary Queen of Scots, co-starring Margot Robbie as Elizabeth I of England. To maintain the distance between their characters, Ronan and Robbie did not interact with one another until filming their climactic encounter. Critic Todd McCarthy praised both actresses' performances and credited Ronan for "carr[ying] the film with fiercely individualistic spirit".

After becoming aware of a forthcoming film adaptation of Louisa May Alcott's novel Little Women, written and directed by Greta Gerwig, Ronan campaigned to play the lead role of Jo March, an aspiring author in the American Civil War era. In preparation, she read Marmee & Louisa, a biography about Alcott and her mother; the cast rehearsed the script for two weeks, and filming took place on location in Concord, Massachusetts. Little Women was released in 2019 to critical acclaim. Richard Lawson of Vanity Fair took note of how well Ronan had portrayed her character "in all her conflicted loyalty, the struggle between her familial contentment and her yearning for something more." The film grossed over $218 million to emerge as her highest-grossing release. Once again, she received Oscar, BAFTA and Golden Globe nominations for Best Actress. This made Ronanat 25 years and six months of agethe second youngest person to accrue four Oscar nominations, behind Jennifer Lawrence.

In 2020, Ronan portrayed the geologist Charlotte Murchison opposite Kate Winslet's Mary Anning in Francis Lee's Ammonite, a drama about a romantic relationship between the two women in the 1840s. The two actresses collaborated closely on the project, and they choreographed their own sex scenes. Steve Pond of TheWrap considered it to be "the most mature performance of [Ronan's] remarkable career". In 2021, Ronan had a small part in Wes Anderson's ensemble film The French Dispatch, about American journalists in France. In the same year, she made her West End theatre debut at London's Almeida Theatre, performing as Lady Macbeth in a revival of The Tragedy of Macbeth, opposite James McArdle. Ronan was intimidated by the experience of performing Shakespeare for the first time in her career, and drew inspiration from Kanye West and Kim Kardashian's marriage for portraying the relationship between Macbeth and Lady Macbeth. Alexandra Pollard of The Independent took note of Ronan's "rare skill to make Shakespeare’s beautiful but weighty words easy to understand". Ronan starred alongside Sam Rockwell as cops solving a murder in 1950s London in the comedy mystery film See How They Run (2022).

Ronan will next star in a film adaptation of the science fiction novel Foe by Iain Reid, directed by Garth Davis, and in The Outrun, an adaptation of Amy Liptrot's memoir of the same name, directed by Nora Fingscheidt. She will also star in Steve McQueen's World War II film Blitz, which will be released on Apple TV+.

Personal life and off-screen work
Ronan holds dual Irish and American citizenship and has said, "I don't know where I am from. I'm just Irish." She also identifies as a New Yorker. She is close with her parents, and lived with them until age 19. She has credited her mother, who accompanied her on film sets as a teenager, for protecting her from uncomfortable situations. In 2018 Ronan purchased a home in Greystones, County Wicklow; she sold the home in late 2019. In late 2020 she purchased a house in West Cork. Since 2018 she has been in a relationship with Scottish actor Jack Lowden, her co-star in Mary Queen of Scots, and divides her time between Dublin, London, and Scotland.

She does not use social media, finding it "too stressful". She had previously joined Twitter in late 2009 due to being a fan of English comedian Stephen Fry, whose heavy usage of the site has been well documented, but soon deleted her account. She said in a February 2018 interview, "I get why musicians do it, and journalists or people in the public eye. But acting is a different thing, 'cause you're not yourself when you're working. I'm not me in anything that anyone sees me in ... and self-promotion has always made me feel really uncomfortable."

Ronan is an ambassador for the Irish Society for the Prevention of Cruelty to Children. She is associated with Home Sweet Home, an anti-homelessness campaign, and supported the organisation's action to illegally take over an office building in Dublin to house 31 homeless families in 2016. That same year, she was featured in a music video for Hozier's song "Cherry Wine", which brought attention to domestic violence. She has supported LGBT rights in Ireland by voting in favour of gay marriage on the 2015 Irish constitutional referendums.

Public image

Erica Wagner of Harper's Bazaar has described Ronan's off-screen persona as "lively, funny, warm", while Vanessa Thorpe of The Guardian found her "unpretentious". While reviewing Lady Bird in 2017, The New York Times critic A. O. Scott called Ronan "one of the most formidable actors in movies today". In 2020, the newspaper ranked her tenth on its list of the greatest actors of the 21st century. In the same year, she was placed sixth on The Irish Times list of Ireland's greatest film actors of all time.

In 2016, Ronan was featured by Forbes in two of their 30 Under 30 lists and in Times Next Generation Leaders list. In 2018, she was featured in Maxims Hot 100 list and was named among the best American actors under 30 by IndieWire. She was ranked one of the best-dressed women in 2018 by the fashion website Net-a-Porter. Also that year, Calvin Klein appointed her and Lupita Nyong'o as the faces of Raf Simons's "Women", his first fragrance for the company. To support sustainable fashion, she wore a dress to the 2020 Oscars that was made from the surplus fabric of the dress she wore to the BAFTAs.

Acting credits

Film

Television

Stage

Music videos

Accolades

Ronan has been recognised by the Academy of Motion Picture Arts and Sciences for the following performances:
 80th Academy Awards: Best Supporting Actress, nomination, for Atonement (2007)
 88th Academy Awards: Best Actress, nomination, for Brooklyn (2015)
 90th Academy Awards: Best Actress, nomination, for Lady Bird (2017)
 92nd Academy Awards: Best Actress, nomination, for Little Women (2019)

At 25 years and six months of age, Ronan is the second youngest person to accrue four Academy Award nominations, behind only American actress Jennifer Lawrence.
She has received five British Academy Film Award nominations, and four Screen Actors Guild Award nominations. She has also received four Golden Globe Award nominations, winning Best Actress in a Motion Picture Musical or Comedy for Lady Bird (2017).

See also
 List of Irish Academy Award winners and nominees
 List of oldest and youngest Academy Award winners and nominees
 List of actors with two or more Academy Award nominations in acting categories

References

External links

 
 

1994 births
21st-century American actresses
21st-century Irish actresses
Actresses from New York City
American emigrants to Ireland
American feminists
American film actresses
American people of Irish descent
American television actresses
Best Actress AACTA International Award winners
Best Musical or Comedy Actress Golden Globe (film) winners
Irish child actresses
Irish feminists
Irish film actresses
Irish television actresses
Irish LGBT rights activists
Living people
People from County Carlow
People from the Bronx
People from Howth